"Girl Don't Tell Me" is a song written by Brian Wilson for the American rock band the Beach Boys, released on July 5, 1965, on the album Summer Days (And Summer Nights!!). It was later included as the B-side of the group's single "Barbara Ann", which was released on December 20, 1965.

Origins
Brian Wilson wrote the song in early 1965 while on honeymoon with Marilyn. He recalled that "a whole song came to me. It was 'Girl Don't Tell Me.' I didn't have any way to get it down. But I just heard the whole thing up there, from start to finish, and I remembered it well enough to go later and write down the lyrics on a piece of paper."

Recording
The Beach Boys recorded "Girl Don't Tell Me" on April 30, 1965, at United Western Recorders. Chuck Britz was the engineer. It was one of the first songs to feature Carl Wilson as lead vocalist and is one of the few Beach Boys tracks from the era to feature no backing vocals.

Beach Boys biographer David Leaf has likened "Girl Don't Tell Me" to the Beatles' 1965 single "Ticket to Ride", in terms of its guitar breaks, drum fills and vocal delivery. Brian Wilson cited this as an example of how each new Beatles release over this period inspired him as a songwriter, and how, with "Girl Don't Tell Me", "I even tried writing a Beatles song." He said that Carl's drawn-out phrasing over the words "you'll write" was taken from "Ticket to Ride". It has been claimed that Brian intended to submit "Girl Don't Tell Me" to the Beatles.

Reception
Cash Box described it as a "pretty, medium-paced tale of remorse."

Personnel 
Sourced from Musician's Union AFM contract sheets and surviving session audio, documented by Craig Slowinski.
The Beach Boys
Bruce Johnston – celesta
Brian Wilson – bass guitar
Carl Wilson – lead vocals, 12-string guitar, acoustic guitar
Dennis Wilson – drums
Additional musicians
Ron Swallow – tambourine

Covers

References 

1965 songs
The Beach Boys songs
Songs written by Brian Wilson
Song recordings produced by Brian Wilson